Vasper is an unincorporated community and coal town in Campbell County, Tennessee. The community no longer has a post office.

References

Unincorporated communities in Campbell County, Tennessee
Unincorporated communities in Tennessee
Coal towns in Tennessee